Gerasim Kochnev (born 20 March 1987) is a Uzbekistani canoeist. He competed in the men's C-1 1000 metres event at the 2016 Summer Olympics.

References

External links
 

1987 births
Living people
Uzbekistani male canoeists
Olympic canoeists of Uzbekistan
Canoeists at the 2016 Summer Olympics
People from Chirchiq
Asian Games gold medalists for Uzbekistan
Asian Games silver medalists for Uzbekistan
Asian Games bronze medalists for Uzbekistan
Asian Games medalists in canoeing
Canoeists at the 2006 Asian Games
Canoeists at the 2010 Asian Games
Canoeists at the 2014 Asian Games
Medalists at the 2006 Asian Games
Medalists at the 2010 Asian Games
Medalists at the 2014 Asian Games
21st-century Uzbekistani people